Ulrike Schmetz (born 30 October 1979) is a German football goalkeeper who currently plays for Bayern Munich. She has also been capped for the German national team.

References

1979 births
Living people
German women's footballers
FC Bayern Munich (women) players
Sportspeople from Bonn
Women's association football goalkeepers
Footballers from North Rhine-Westphalia
Germany women's international footballers